European records in the sport of track cycling are the all-time best marks set by racing for a member nation of the Union Européenne de Cyclisme (UEC). UEC doesn't maintain an official list for such performances. All bests shown on this list are tracked by statisticians not officially sanctioned by the governing body.

Men

Women

* In 2013, the 3000m team pursuit, 3 rider format was replaced by the UCI with a 4000m team pursuit, 4 person format.

References

External links
UEC web site

Cycle racing in Europe
Track cycling records
Cycling, Track